H. Ed Cox is an American artist and fantasy illustrator whose work has appeared in role-playing games.

Career
His Dungeons & Dragons work includes the 3.5 Dungeon Master's Guide (2003), Complete Warrior (2003), Frostburn (2004), Races of Destiny (2004), Sandstorm (2005), Lords of Madness (2005), Tome of Magic (2006), Complete Scoundrel (2007), and Magic Item Compendium (2007).

He has also worked on the Legend of the Five Rings, and 7th Sea collectible card games.

He did the cover art for Mark W. Tiedemann's 2001 novel Compass Reach.

He has illustrated box covers for MPC model kits based on Star Wars and other franchises.

He was the guest of honor at the Oasis 17 science fiction literary convention in 2004.

Cox was nominated for a Chesley Award, for Best Monochrome Work – Unpublished, in 1999, for his work "A Hard Act to Follow".

References

External links
 Ed Cox's website

Living people
Place of birth missing (living people)
Role-playing game artists
Year of birth missing (living people)